Area code 501 is a telephone area code serving central Arkansas, including Little Rock and most of its suburbs. The coverage area includes most communities in Cleburne, Conway, Faulkner, Garland, Hot Spring, Lonoke, Perry, Pulaski, Saline, White and Van Buren counties.

It is one of the original 86 North American Numbering Plan areas assigned in 1947, and originally covered all of Arkansas.  Due to Arkansas' relatively low population density, 501 remained the sole area code for the state until 1995, when area code 870 was created to serve north-central, northeast, eastern and southern Arkansas.  In 2002, the northwestern part of the state, including Fort Smith and Fayetteville, split off as area code 479.
Major cities in area code 501 include:

 Benton
 Bryant
 Cabot
 Conway
 Hot Springs
 Jacksonville
 Little Rock
 Malvern
 Morrilton
 North Little Rock
 Searcy
 Sherwood

Prior to October 2021, area code 501 had telephone numbers assigned for the central office code 988. In 2020, 988 was designated nationwide as a dialing code for the National Suicide Prevention Lifeline, which created a conflict for exchanges that permit seven-digit dialing. This area code was therefore scheduled to transition to ten-digit dialing by October 24, 2021.

References

External links 

 List of exchanges from AreaCodeDownload.com, 501 Area Code
 501 Area Code
 gosloto
 10eloto
 play-jetx
 Gosloto Results 6/45
 bik
 toto4d
 sinuanonoche

Telecommunications-related introductions in 1947
501
501